Rachel Barton Butler (born in the mid-1880s – November 24, 1920) was an American writer, lyricist, and playwright.

Early life
Rachel Barton Butler was born in Cincinnati, Ohio (sources vary on the date, either 1883 or 1888), the daughter of Edward Smith Butler and Lily Lovell Butler. She graduated from the University of Cincinnati. She acted and worked in theatre for a time, then pursued further studies at  Radcliffe College, where she was part of the drama workshop under George Pierce Baker. Her play, Prudence in Particular, won the MacDowell Club Fellowship competition in 1915. Another play, Mama's Affair, won the $500 Morosco Prize for a play written by a Harvard or Radcliffe student of Baker's. A third student play of hers, Francois-Amour (a one-act "fantasie in rhymed couplets"), won a Harvard Dramatic Club competition in 1916.

Career

Butler wrote the verses for Songs and Shadow Pictures for the Child World (1909), which included music composed by Jessie Gaynor and cut-paper illustrations by Susanne Fenimore Tyndale. She was credited as lyricist in the sheet music for "Baby Clover" (1906), with music by Charles Willeby, sung by Australian Ada Crossley. Her poem "March Violets" appeared in The Cavalier (March 1909).

In 1920, Butler's comedy Mama's Affair ran on Broadway for four months, produced by Oliver Morosco and starring Amelia Bingham, Robert Edeson, Katherine Kaelred, George Le Guere, and Effie Shannon. The following year, the show was adapted into a silent film, with some of the same cast, but with Constance Talmadge and Gertrude Le Brandt also appearing. Butler wrote at least three other plays, West of Omaha (a one-act farce), Mom and The Lap-Dog. She adapted Alice in Wonderland for a 1920 children's production starring Mabel Taliaferro, a fundraiser for the New York Kindergarten Association.

Butler's works were adapted into two other silent films, Must We Marry? (1928) and Broken Hearted (1929).

Personal life
Rachel Barton Butler married actor Boyd Agin in 1919. She died suddenly in Greenwich, Connecticut late in 1920, in her thirties.

References

External links
Rachel Barton Butler's listing on IBDB.
Rachel Barton Butler's listing on IMDb.

American women dramatists and playwrights
1880s births
1920 deaths
Radcliffe College alumni
University of Cincinnati alumni
American lyricists
20th-century American dramatists and playwrights
20th-century American women writers